The first cabinet of Iuliu Maniu was the government of Romania from 10 November 1928 to 6 June 1930.

Ministers
The ministers of the cabinet were as follows:

President of the Council of Ministers:
Iuliu Maniu (10 November 1928 – 6 June 1930)
Minister of the Interior: 
Alexandru Vaida-Voevod (10 November 1928 – 6 June 1930)
Minister of Foreign Affairs: 
George G. Mironescu (10 November 1928 – 6 June 1930)
Minister of Finance:
Mihai Popovici (10 November 1928 – 15 October 1929)
(interim) Iuliu Maniu (15 – 26 October 1929)
(interim) Virgil Madgearu (26 October – 14 November 1929)
Virgil Madgearu (14 November 1929 – 6 June 1930)
Minister of Justice:
Grigore Iunian (10 November 1928 – 7 March 1930)
Voicu Nițescu (7 March – 6 June 1930)
Minister of Public Instruction:
Nicolae Costăchescu (10 November 1928 – 14 November 1929)
Minister of Religious Affairs and the Arts:
Aurel Vlad (10 November 1928 – 14 November 1929)
Minister of Public Instruction and Religious Affairs:
Nicolae Costăchescu (14 November 1929 – 6 June 1930)
Minister of War:
Gen. Henri Cihoski (10 November 1928 – 5 April 1930)
(interim) Iuliu Maniu (5 – 14 April 1930)
Gen. Nicolae Condeescu (14 April 1930 – 6 June 1930)
Minister of Agriculture and Property:
Ion Mihalache (10 November 1928 – 6 June 1930)
Minister of Industry and Commerce:
Virgil Madgearu (10 November 1928 – 14 November 1929)
Aurel Vlad (14 November 1929 – 7 March 1930)
Eduard Mirto (7 March – 6 June 1930)
Ministry of Labour, Social Insurance and Cooperation
Ion Răducanu (10 November 1928 – 14 November 1929)
Minister of Public Health and Social Welfare:
Sever Dan (10 November 1928 – 14 November 1929)
Minister of Labour, Health, and Social Security:
Ion Răducanu (14 November 1929 – 6 June 1930)
Minister of Public Works:
(interim) Pantelimon Halippa (10 November 1928 – 14 November 1929)
Minister of Communications:
Gen. Nicolae Alevra  (10 November 1928 – 15 October 1929)
(interim) Voicu Nițescu (15 October – 14 November 1929)
Minister of Public Works and Communications:
(interim) Pantelimon Halippa (14 November 1929 – 6 June 1930)

Ministers of State:
Pantelimon Halippa (10 November 1928 – 14 November 1929)
Sever Bocu (10 November 1928 – 14 November 1929)
Voicu Nițescu (10 November 1928 – 14 November 1929)
Teofil Sauciuc-Săveanu (10 November 1928 – 14 November 1929)

References

Cabinets of Romania
Cabinets established in 1928
Cabinets disestablished in 1930
1928 establishments in Romania
1930 disestablishments in Romania